In alchemy, an athanor (at-tannūr) is a furnace used to provide a uniform and constant heat for alchemical digestion. Etymologically, it descends from a number of Arabic texts of the period of the Califate which use the term "al-tannoor" in talismanic alchemy, meaning a bread-oven, from which the design portrayed evidently descends.

The athanor was also called Piger Henricus ("Slow Henry"), because it was chiefly used in slower operations, and because when once filled with coals, it keeps burning a long time. For this reason the Greeks referred to it as "giving no trouble", as it did not need to be continually attended. It was also called the Philosophical furnace, Furnace of Arcana, or popularly, the Tower furnace.

Other references
In the work Life of Apollonius by Philostratus the Athenian, an allegorical description is given of an occult hill.  The author gives this hill the name "Athanor".

"Athanor" is the name of two works by 20th century German artist Anselm Kiefer: one currently displayed in the Toledo Museum of Art and the other commissioned by the Louvre museum in 2007 and displayed there. The word was also used the title of a 1968 book of poetry by the Romanian author Gellu Naum, a musical work for orchestra by French composer Joël-François Durand (written in 2001 and premiered by the BBC Symphony Orchestra  in 2003), a 1990s noel series by American author Jane Lindskold, a photo collage by Romanian artist Geta Bratescu (b. 1926), and an artwork by Janet Saad-Cook located at Boston University's Photonics Center.

The Athanor Academy of Performing Arts Passau founded in 1995 in the German town Passau is named after this furnace, as is the Belgian , a Masonic Lodge.

The Athanor magazine is a review of language philosophy, history, and international politics, published once or twice a year.

References

External links

Athanor as an occult hill
The Life of Apollonius of Tyana - by Philostratus; selection of extracts from the translation of F. C. Conybeare, including translator's introduction (1912)

Alchemical tools